The 1990 Army Cadets football team was an American football team that represented the United States Military Academy in the 1990 NCAA Division I-A football season. In their eighth season under head coach Jim Young, the Cadets compiled a 6–5 record and outscored their opponents by a combined total of 295 to 264.  In the annual Army–Navy Game, the Cadets defeated Navy, 30–20.

Schedule

Personnel

Season summary

Holy Cross

VMI

at Wake Forest

Duke

at Boston College

Lafayette

Syracuse

Rutgers

100th anniversary of Army football

Air Force

at Vanderbilt

vs Navy

90th meeting

References

Army
Army Black Knights football seasons
Army Cadets football